Guárico State is one of the 23 states of Venezuela. The state capital is San Juan de Los Morros. It is named for the Guárico River.

History

Conquest and colony of Spain
When the Europeans arrived in Venezuela, various ethnic groups inhabited the region that would constitute Guárico. Among these were the Caribs Tamanacos, Palenques and Cumanagotos, as well as groups of Guamos and Otomacos. The latter were in permanent confrontation with the Caribs.

The colonization of the region only began in the 17th century and above all in the 18th century. The cacique Chiparara managed to organize Carib and Otomac groups in the Llanos de Guárico to counter-attack the Spanish colonizing forces.4 After they were defeated, around 1653, the Carib and Otomac groups would retreat southward or lose cohesion and would be gradually assimilated.
Many of the settlers who settled in the area were Basque missionaries and encomenderos who founded Altagracia de Orituco on March 1, 1676. Miguel de Urbés, a lieutenant of Joan Orpí, founded the city of Zaraza in 1645 with the name of San Miguel de la Nueva Tarragona del Batey. El Sombrero was founded in 1720. Four years later they founded Calabozo. In 1728 they established the town of Chaguaramas in a place where there were settlements of cumanagotos. Fray Anselmo Isidro de Ardales established the town of Tucupido in 1760 with groups of cumanagotes and palenques. San Juan de los Morros would be founded much later, around 1780.

Alexander von Humboldt and Aimé Bonpland passed through the region in March 1800 on their way to the Orinoco and its tributaries.

During the time of Spanish rule, Guarico was part of the Province of Caracas, which belonged to the Captaincy General of Venezuela.

19th Century
During the war of independence, several battles took place in the region of Guárico.

The military chief José Tomás Boves defeated Vicente Campo Elías in La Puerta, near San Juan de los Morros, on February 3, 1814. A few months later, in June, the Spanish troops again under the command of Boves defeated the troops of Simón Bolívar and Santiago Mariño on the same battlefield.

On August 2, 1816 the battle of Quebrada Honda near El Socorro took place. The royalists were defeated by the Republican army led by the Scottish adventurer Gregor MacGregor.

The Plains troops led by José Antonio Páez defeated the Royalist forces of Marshal Pablo Morillo on February 12, 1818. However, Morillo was able to defeat the troops of General Simón Bolívar in the third battle of La Puerta.

After independence, Guárico became the scene of numerous battles in the civil wars that plagued the country in the 19th century.

Venezuela entered into a deep crisis from 1842 onwards. In 1846 an uprising took place that was particularly felt in Guárico. Peasants and other poor people complained about social injustice and numerous groups criticized the political situation in which only a few elites held all the power. The protests continued until May 1847.

The creation with the name of Guárico Province dates from 1848 when the province of Caracas was divided into three.

In 1856 Guárico became part of the 21 provinces of Venezuela until 1864 when it was declared an independent state, and an integral part of the United States of Venezuela.

On February 17, 1860, the battle of Coplé between the federalist and central government troops took place near Calabozo. The battle itself did not give clear results, but the continuation of the guerrilla warfare after this episode led to the signing of a peace agreement on March 23, 1893 between the Federalists and the government of the caudillo Antonio Guzmán Blanco.

In 1879 the state became part of the Gran Estado Miranda with what is now Bolívar (present-day Miranda), Guzmán Blanco (present-day Aragua), Apure and Nueva Esparta. In 1889 this state was renamed Miranda.

On March 11, 1892, the caudillo Joaquín Crespo rose up against the president of that time, Raimundo Andueza Palacio, who had wanted to change the constitution at the beginning of 1892 in order to supposedly govern for two more years. Joaquín Crespo marched from his hacienda in Guárico to Caracas, where he took power.

In 1898, Guárico acquired its autonomy again and in 1899 it was ratified by presidential decree. From this date on, it remained an independent state even though it suffered changes in its territory. Its boundaries with the state of Aragua were established by a protocol signed in 1933.

General Juan Vicente Gómez defeated near San Juan de los Morros the troops of General Luciano Mendoza, who was fighting on the side of the so-called Liberating Revolution against Cipriano Castro.

20th Century
Foreign companies began to exploit oil in the Guárico area in 1946. The fields of El Carrizal and El Sombrero began to attract many workers.

In 1957 the construction of the Guárico reservoir began. With 230 km2, it is one of the largest irrigation reservoirs in Venezuela and has been contributing to the development of the country.

Geography

Guárico is known as "the gateway" to the Central Plains, with a geography of contrasts between mountainous areas near the border of the state of Cojedes, galleys (because of their hat shape) or hills that accompany the course of the river Guárico and an equally wide area of flat land.

Guárico State is bounded on the north by Miranda, Aragua and Carabobo States, on the south by Bolívar and Apure, on the east by Anzoátegui State and on the west by Cojedes and Barinas States.

Climate
The average annual temperature is 26 °C.

Relief
Most of it is flat and occupies the Central Plains of the country. To the northwest, it has low mountains, also known as Morros, and hills of the Cordillera de la Costa.

Main Mountains of Guarico State
The mountainous part of Guárico includes the Fila de los Suspiros, bordering the state of Cojedes to the northwest, continues with the Fila de La Raya, also called La Escalera, until reaching the city of San Juan de los Morros, some of which can reach 2000 meters above sea level. Other mountains to the east of the state include Cerro de las Minas, the Serranía de Guatopo strip on the sides of the Orituco River Valleys.

Hydrography
The state of Guarico is crossed by several rivers, streams and morichals that remain even during the dry months. The rivers of the Unare Basin from Valle de la Pascua head towards the Caribbean Sea and include the main rivers: Unare, Quebrada Honda, Morichito, Ipire and Agua Amarilla. The rest of the state has rivers that are tributaries of the Orinoco River, including the Apure River in its lower basin, Chirgua, Espino, Guárico, Macaira, Manapire, Memo, Tamanaco, Tiznados, Tucupido, Orituco and Zuata.

Politics and government
It is an autonomous and equal state in political terms, organizing its administration and public powers through a Constitution of the Guárico State, dictated by the Legislative Council.

Executive Power
The Governor of the State of Guárico is the Chief Executive of that State located in the center of Venezuela. According to Article 160 of the Venezuelan Constitution of 1999, the governor must be: Venezuelan, over twenty-five years old and from a secular state. The governor is elected for four years by simple majority and can be re-elected for additional periods. The governor appoints a group of trusted secretaries to assist him in the functions of the government who are freely appointed and removed. The governor is accountable for his actions to the Guarico State Legislative Council
The current governor is José Manuel Vásquez Aranguren of the ruling PSUV party. There have been nine people in the Llanera entity who have held the post of governor.

Like the other 23 federal entities of Venezuela, the State maintains its own police force, which is supported and complemented by the National Police and the Venezuelan National Guard.

Legislative power
The state legislature is the responsibility of the Legislative Council of the State of Guárico, a unicameral parliament, elected by the people through a universal direct and secret vote every four years. It can be reelected for two consecutive periods, under a system of proportional representation of the population of the state and its municipalities.

Municipalities and municipal seats

 Camaguán (Camaguán)
 Chaguaramas (Chaguaramas)
 El Socorro (El Socorro)
 Francisco de Miranda (Calabozo)
 José Félix Ribas (Tucupido)
 José Tadeo Monagas (Altagracia de Orituco)
 Juan Germán Roscio (San Juan de los Morros)
 Julián Mellado (El Sombrero)
 Las Mercedes (Las Mercedes del Llano)
 Leonardo Infante (Valle de la Pascua)
 Ortiz (Ortiz)
 Pedro Zaraza (Zaraza)
 San Gerónimo de Guayabal (Guayabal)
 San José de Guaribe (San José de Guaribe)
 Santa María de Ipire (Santa María de Ipire)

Demographics 
It is important to mention that because the last census was conducted in 2011, the population in the cities has changed significantly over the past few years. It is currently estimated that the capital, San Juan de los Morros is the most populated city in the state of Guarico, with 160,248 inhabitants.

Race and ethnicity 

According to the 2011 Census, the racial composition of the population was:

Education

Universities
Rómulo Gallegos National Experimental University of the Central Plains
National Open University
National Experimental Polytechnic University of the National Armed Force
Simón Rodríguez National Experimental University
Universidad Pedagógica Experimental Libertador
Bolivarian University of Venezuela
National Institute for Educational Cooperation
Monsignor Arias Blanco University Institute
University Institute of Technology of Los Llanos
University College of Administration and Marketing

Economy

Agriculture is the main economic activity in this state. Guárico also occupies a significant place in the cultivation of cereals such as rice,8 corn and sorghum. This activity is linked to the agro-industrial sector, both supported by the existence of 16 reservoirs and three risk systems (Guárico, Orituco, and Tiznados rivers).

With respect to livestock, the production of cattle and pigs stands out. And within the timber activity, the production of wood in rola is located in the seventh place of the national total.

Forest resources
We can find: Aceituno, araguaney, ceiba, cherry, drago, jobo, puy, saqui-saqui, among others.

Mineral Resources
Silica sands, barite, gravel, vanadium, gypsum, zinc and gravel.

Petroleum
The state of Guárico also has vast oil reserves concentrated mainly in the south in the so-called Orinoco Oil Belt. In the Boyacá Field located in the south-central part of Guárico State there are 8 oil blocks and reserves estimated at 489 billion barrels.  In the Junín Field located in the Southeast of Guárico State and the Southwest of Anzoátegui State there are 10 blocks with reserves estimated at 557,000 million barrels.

Tourism

San Juan de Los Morros Thermal Waters
These are sulphurous, alkaline, borate waters, with a blue colour and an average temperature of 33.5 °C. It is a thermo-mineral spring with a capacity of 6800 L/h. They are surrounded by a dry tropical forest, with very arid vegetation. It has bathrooms, pools and various services. They are located northwest of San Juan de Los Morros, 58 km from Maracay.

Thermal waters of Gurumen
These are waters that flow from galleys, forming four wells or springs. It has pools and bathing rooms. They are located between the towns of Ortiz and San Francisco de Cara, 60 km from San Juan de Los Morros.

Aguaro-Guariquito National Park
It was created on March 7, 1974. It covers an area of 596,000 ha, making it the second largest national park in Venezuela. Its area is covered by savannahs and forests, rivers, lagoons and a rich flora of great color and beauty and a varied fauna. It is located in the south of Guárico State, between the municipalities of Sebastián Francisco de Miranda and Las Mercedes.

Guatopo National Park
It was created on March 31, 1958. It comprises the mountainous region of the Interior Range, between Santa Teresa del Tuy and Altagracia de Orituco. It has an extension of 92,640 ha. The vegetation is tropical rainforest and semi-wet formations. The fauna is wild and very rich in mammals.

It has three important recreational facilities: Agua Blanca, Santa Crucecita and Quebrada de Guatopo. Excursions and long walks can be made in them. It is located between the districts of Independencia, Lander and Acevedo in the state of Miranda and the district of Monagas in the state of Guarico.

Guanapito Reservoir
Main source of water supply and treatment for the Orituco, especially for the valleys, and which is revealed in the area where the population of Guanape once existed.
The dam is built with cement, stone, and sand; its gates are constantly monitored by a control point, which is manually backed up if it does not work.

Morros de Macaira Natural Monument

Morros de Macaira Natural Monument is a natural monument located in the State of Guárico[1] in Venezuela. It was created in 1978. It covers an area of 99 hectares. Throughout the region, it is common to find limestone massifs, caves furrowed by small watercourses, and deep vertical peaks.

Morros de Macaira Natural Monument is located in the municipality of José Tadeo Monagas. The western boundary of the monument is determined by the road that connects Altagracia de Orituco with San Francisco de Macaira.

Its main attraction is the limestone formation of great paleontological and environmental value. It is made up of three massifs, which house numerous caves crossed by river torrents. The vegetation is mainly composed of semi-deciduous forests and semi-deciduous shrubs in the mountainous forest region of the Venezuelan coastal range.

Aristides Rojas Natural Monument (Morros de San Juan)

It was created on November 11, 1949 and its area is 1,630 hectares. Its main attraction are the "morros", geological formations of peculiar shapes. They are populated by hill and forest savannas. It is located 5 km northwest of San Juan de Los Morros.

The name and current boundaries of the province are the result of the political organization defined in the Ley de División Político Territorial (Political Territorial Division Law) of April 28, 1856. The name comes from the Guárico River, which in the Caribbean dialect means cacique.

Tierra Blanca Reservoir
Built in 1976, it supplies approximately 300 liters per second to San Juan de los Morros and is also a recreational park with activities planned and directed by groups based on government programs.

Culture

Tourist Carnival of the Venezuelan Eastern Plain
This festivity generally takes place in February in the city of Zaraza, being the main tourist attraction in that season in the whole llanoriental region, one of the main and most important carnivals in Venezuela, capable of attracting exorbitant numbers of tourists compared to other festivities of the same nature. Characterized by the majesty with which large, illuminated and colorful floats and groups are made, besides that on the same date the "Agro-industrial Fairs of the Unare River Basin" are held in the city, placing Zaraza as one of the most important tourist destinations in the state and the country.

Fairs of San Miguel Arcángel
Religious and socio-cultural festivities that take place from September 21 to October 4, in Altagracia de Orituco, where the most famous national groups attend.

Candlemas Fairs
Religious and socio-cultural festivities, which take place in the first week of February, motivated by the day of Our Lady of Candelaria on February 2. They take place in Valle de la Pascua. They are considered one of the most important fairs in the state, where there are also agricultural and livestock exhibitions, with national call and / or participation.

Cruz Wake
Religious and social festival held during the month of May, where the most famous reciters in the country sing "fulias" accompanied by music of cuatro, guitar, maracas, harp and drum.

The Guarandol Bird
Comparsa formed by several people who dance and sing. The central characters are three: the guarandol bird, the sorcerer and the hunter. The motive for this entertainment revolves around the hunting of the bird, the plea not to kill it and the intervention of the sorcerer to resurrect it.

La Burriquita
It is a dance where the main character of the dance wears a costume that allows him to represent donkey and rider at the same time. She dances to the beat of a joropo, does pirouettes, brays and does all the things typical of the donkey and her rider.

When the Spaniards arrived to American lands they brought with them manifestations, expressions and religious celebrations and these joined those contributed by the manifestations of our aborigines and the afrodecendant culture enriching the cultural legacy. The Burriquita is part of the transfer of cultures from Spain, it has influence in two manifestations: the dance of the heifers and the horses. It entered through Cubagua, the first settlement in our territory due to its pearl wealth and later with the system of missions and parcels penetrate the entire country, the first to present this manifestation fuela Zone of the East of the country and then spread throughout the width and length of Venezuela. You can see the burriquita dancing in the streets especially during Carnival, but also at Christmas Easter in some places in the east and west of the country. There are states like Táchira where this fun has lost the accompanying music and there is only the custom of taking out "la burrita" to amuse children and adults with their capers running through the streets of the town.

Gastronomy
The quintessential symbol dish is "Pisillo Guariqueño", a fried dish seasoned with garlic and sweet chili in which threads of salted and sun-dried venison, as well as cattle, fish or chigüire, are curled.

The traditional chicken stew is also often prepared in this region. The basic ingredient is chicken, cooked with plenty of green seasoning and vegetables. Another well known dish throughout the country, but which in San Juan presents a variation is mondongo, since in addition to vegetables and beef, lemon, cattle feet and belly are added.

Another dish is the fried permitta, where the meat of this exquisite fish is used, seasoned with garlic, salt and lemon; then it is fried wrapped in flour. It is also very famous the morrocoy cake, a very appreciated dish all over the country, whose elaboration is based on the morrocoy meat, seasoning, raisins, eggs, potatoes, wine and spices. The variant of this recipe -considered a delicacy- is the turtle cake, which has the same ingredients, except for the meat. In some parts of the country, this culinary tradition has been diminished for ecological reasons, in order to preserve the species. However, there are still many places where it can be tasted.

Joropo
The joropo is sung and danced all over Venezuela. It is not only a danceable expression, but also a party where corridos, galerones, golpes, passages and other folkloric tonalities are sung and danced. It takes place at any time of the year and the motive can be a baptism, birthday or the celebration of a patron saint's day. The music of the joropo is played with typical instruments such as cuatro, maracas and harp, which accompany songs and choruses.

The zapateo and escobilleo, which are steps of the joropo, are mixed in the state with typical turns of the region like the remolino, the cuartao and the toriao.

See also
 States of Venezuela
 John the Baptist Monument

References

External links

 guarico.com.ve

 
States of Venezuela
States and territories established in 1900